Consuelita is a 1925 Italian silent comedy film directed by Roberto Roberti and starring Francesca Bertini, Ida Carloni Talli and Alfonso Cassini.

Cast
 Francesca Bertini 
 Ida Carloni Talli 
 Alfonso Cassini 
 Guido Graziosi

References

Bibliography
 Cristina Jandelli. Le dive italiane del cinema muto. L'epos, 2006.

External links

1925 films
1920s Italian-language films
Films directed by Roberto Roberti
Italian silent feature films
Italian comedy films
1925 comedy films
Italian black-and-white films
Silent comedy films
1920s Italian films